The Basra governorate election of 2009 was held on 31 January 2009 alongside elections for all other governorates outside Iraqi Kurdistan and Kirkuk.

Background 

One seat in the election is reserved for Assyrian Christians 

Basra is the main oil-producing and transit centre in Iraq, which has led to intense competition over control of its Governorate. It has been the centre of competition between the al-Maliki Federal government, which controls the police and army, the Islamic Virtue Party Governor of Basra which controls the Oil Protection Corps and local militias from the Sadrist Movement and Tharallah. Following the Battle of Basra in 2008, the central government seized control of the city's streets from the Sadrist Movement and the security situation improved.

In April 2007, SIIC successfully brought a no-confidence motion against Governor Waili. This dismissal was ratified by Prime Minister Nouri al-Maliki in July, but eventually overturned by the Supreme Court.

The central government has organized "Local Support Committee" militias, has spent $100 million in reconstruction projects and has started paying unemployment benefits in the province. This was expected to lead to an increased support for Prime Minister Nouri al-Maliki's Islamic Dawa Party.

Meanwhile, the Islamic Virtue Party dropped Waeli from its candidate list, reportedly due to his "polarizing" effect.

In a move away from their traditional apolitical stance, a list with a core support from the Shaykhiya religious community stood for the first time.

Basra Region 

In November 2008 Wael Abdul Latif, an Independent Islamist MP backed by tribal Sheikhs, submitted a petition to the Electoral Commission of Iraq signed by 34,800 people calling for a vote on a Region of Iraq covering only the governorate of Basrah. The Sadrist movement opposed the move, saying it was "playing with fire" as did the Islamic Dawa Party of Prime Minister Nouri al-Maliki. SCIRI remained neutral, as it supports a nine-province Region covered the whole of southern Iraq. As the petition was signed by more than 2% of the population, the commission published an official request for signatures; if more than 10% of the population had signed it before 15 January 2009, a referendum would have been held within 15 days. In the event, the initiative failed to reach 10% and was struck down by the Electoral Commission. Backers accused the al-Maliki federal government of blocking their media campaign and appealed the decision to the Federal Court.

Results 

|- style="background-color:#E9E9E9"
!style="text-align:left;vertical-align:top;" |Coalition 2005/2009!! Allied national parties !! Leader !!Seats (2005) !! Seats (2009) !! Change !!Votes
|-
| style="text-align:left;" |State of Law Coalition || style="text-align:left;" | Islamic Dawa Party ||Nouri Al-Maliki|| 3 || 20 ||+17 || 239,007
|-
| style="text-align:left;" |Al Mihrab Martyr List || style="text-align:left;" |ISCI|| Abdul Aziz al-Hakim|| 20 || 5 || -15 || 74,879
|-
| style="text-align:left;" |Gathering of Justice and Unity || || || - || 2 || +2 || 34,862
|-
| style="text-align:left;" |Independent Free Movement List || style="text-align:left;" |Sadrist Movement || Muqtada al-Sadr || 2 || 2 || - || 32,020
|-
| style="text-align:left;" |Iraqi Islamic Party|| style="text-align:left;" |Iraqi Islamic Party ||Tariq al-Hashimi || - || 2 || +2 || 24,817
|-
| style="text-align:left;" |Iraqi National List|| style="text-align:left;" |Iraqi National Accord ||Iyad Allawi || 4 || 2 || -2 || 21,091
|-
| style="text-align:left;" |Islamic Virtue Party || style="text-align:left;" |Islamic Virtue Party ||Abdelrahim Al-Husseini || 12 || 1 || -11 || 20,932
|-
| style="text-align:left;" |Chaldean Democratic Union Party (Assyrian reserved seat) || style="text-align:left;" |CDUP  ||Ablahad Afraim Sawa || - || 1 || +1 || 227
|-
| style="text-align:left;" |Other Parties||  || ||  || ||  || 198,274
|-
| colspan=2 style="text-align:left;" |Total || || 41 || 35 || -6 || 646,109
|-
| colspan=5 style="text-align:left;" |Sources: this article - Al Sumaria - New York Times - 
|}

See also 

 Assyrian politics in Iraq#Iraqi Governorate Elections 2009

References 

2009 Iraqi governorate elections